The Treaty of the Creek Agency was signed on January 22, 1818, at the Creek Agency on the Flint River in Georgia. The treaty was handled for the U.S. by former Governor of Georgia David Brydie Mitchell who was serving as President James Monroe's agent of Indian affairs for the Creek nation. The terms of the treaty ceded two tracts of land to the United States in exchange for $120,000 paid to the Creeks over the course of 11 years.

See also
 Treaty of Moultrie Creek
 List of treaties

External links
Text of the Treaty

 

Creek Agency (1818)
1818 treaties
Legal history of Georgia (U.S. state)
1818 in Georgia (U.S. state)
January 1818 events